Neoclypeodytes is a genus of beetles in the family Dytiscidae found in North and Central America, containing the following species:

 Neoclypeodytes amybethae K.B.Miller, 2001
 Neoclypeodytes anasinus K.B.Miller, 2001
 Neoclypeodytes astrapus K.B.Miller, 2001
 Neoclypeodytes balkei Scheers & Hajek, 2020
 Neoclypeodytes challeti K.B.Miller, 2001
 Neoclypeodytes cinctellus (LeConte, 1852)
 Neoclypeodytes curtulus (Sharp, 1887)
 Neoclypeodytes discedens (Sharp, 1882)
 Neoclypeodytes discretus (Sharp, 1882)
 Neoclypeodytes edithae K.B.Miller, 2001
 Neoclypeodytes fortunensis Scheers & Hajek, 2020
 Neoclypeodytes fryii (Clark, 1862)
 Neoclypeodytes haroldi K.B.Miller, 2001
 Neoclypeodytes latifrons (Sharp, 1882)
 Neoclypeodytes leachi (Leech, 1948)
 Neoclypeodytes luctuosus (Guignot, 1949)
 Neoclypeodytes lynceus (Sharp, 1882)
 Neoclypeodytes megalus K.B.Miller, 2001
 Neoclypeodytes moroni Arce-Pérez & Novelo-Gutiérrez, 2015
 Neoclypeodytes nanus K.B.Miller, 2001
 Neoclypeodytes obesus (Sharp, 1882)
 Neoclypeodytes ornatellus (Fall, 1917)
 Neoclypeodytes pictodes (Sharp, 1882)
 Neoclypeodytes plicipennis (Crotch, 1873)
 Neoclypeodytes quadrinotatus (Sharp, 1882)
 Neoclypeodytes quadripustulatus (Fall, 1917)
 Neoclypeodytes roughleyi K.B.Miller, 2001
 Neoclypeodytes similis K.B.Miller, 2001
 Neoclypeodytes tumulus K.B.Miller, 2001

References

Dytiscidae